Anacithara simplex is a species of sea snail, a marine gastropod mollusk in the family Horaiclavidae.

Description

Distribution
This marine species occurs off KwaZulu-Natal, South Africa

References

 Turton, William Harry. The marine shells of Port Alfred, S. Africa. H. Milford, Oxford University Press, 1932.

External links
  Tucker, J.K. 2004 Catalog of recent and fossil turrids (Mollusca: Gastropoda). Zootaxa 682:1–1295.
 Biolib: Anacithara simplex

Endemic fauna of South Africa
simplex
Gastropods described in 1932